Tapureli ruins are in Mersin Province, Turkey.

Geography 
Limonlu River is a small river in Erdemli district of Mersin Province. It was named Lamos River in the antiquity and it was usually taken as the borderline between Cilicia Trachaea and Cilicia Pedias.

The ruins 

The original settlement was a Hellenistic settlement which was rebuilt during Roman (and early Byzantine) era. The ruins which are more or less devastated are examples of civil architecture including five churches, a necropolis, a horizontal sundial, cisterns as well as houses. The finds retrieved after the excavations carried on in the eastern church code named A are now exhibited in Mersin Archaeological Museum.

See also

Tapureli

References 

Ancient Greek archaeological sites in Turkey
Former populated places in Turkey
Erdemli District
Archaeological sites in Mersin Province, Turkey
Olba territorium